Trioceros deremensis, the Usambara three-horned chameleon or wavy chameleon, is a species of chameleon native to Tanzania.

Description

This species can grow from about 30 to 40 cm in length and weigh 120 to 150 grams.

Distribution
The Usambara three-horned chameleon is found in Afrotemperate rain forest patches in multiple mountain ranges. It lives in isolated populations, usually away from the forest edge, within a range of about 1,400 km2. It is endemic to East Usambara, Uluguru, Nguu and Nguru Mountains, and Udzungwa Mountains.

Pet trade
This species is captured for sale to hobbyists. Between 1992 and 2011 a total of 8,437 live specimens were exported, 622 of which were not captured from the wild, but bred or born in captivity.

References

External links

deremensis
Reptiles of Tanzania
Endemic fauna of Tanzania
Reptiles described in 1892
Taxa named by Paul Matschie